Vyacheslav Vinnik (born 3 December 1939) is a Soviet sprint canoer who competed in the early 1960s. He won two medals at the 1963 ICF Canoe Sprint World Championships in Jajce with a silver in the K-1 4 x 500 m and a bronze in the K-4 1000 m events. He also won 3 gold and 1 bronze medals in Edmonton, AB, Canada championship in July 2005.

References

Living people
Soviet male canoeists
1939 births
ICF Canoe Sprint World Championships medalists in kayak